Anastasia Diodorova, (Russian: Анастасия Алексеевна Диодорова), is a Paralympic swimmer from Russia competing mainly in category S6 events.

Career 
Anastasia competed in both the 2004 and 2008 Summer Paralympics winning a silver medal.  In 2004, she competed in the 100m backstroke and 50m butterfly finishing fourth in the final of both events.  In 2008, she finished fourth in the final of the 100m backstroke, eighth in the final of the 200m individual medley, in the 50m butterfly she won a silver medal behind Fuying Jiang of China who set a new world record but ahead of Ukraine's Olena Akopyan who had set a world record in the heats that Anastasia swam faster than in the final.

References

External links
 

Paralympic swimmers of Russia
Swimmers at the 2004 Summer Paralympics
Swimmers at the 2008 Summer Paralympics
Paralympic silver medalists for Russia
Russian female backstroke swimmers
Russian female butterfly swimmers
Russian female freestyle swimmers
Living people
Swimmers at the 2012 Summer Paralympics
Medalists at the 2008 Summer Paralympics
S6-classified Paralympic swimmers
Year of birth missing (living people)
Medalists at the World Para Swimming Championships
Medalists at the World Para Swimming European Championships
Paralympic medalists in swimming
20th-century Russian women
21st-century Russian women